The Yugoslavia national rugby union  U19 team used to represent Yugoslavia at Rugby union in under-age competitions until the 1990s.

History

 U19 made their debut in FIRA Championship 1974 in Heidelberg (Germany)against a Romanian, losing 6 points to 35.

 U19 regularly played in FIRA Championships till 1990 and event in Treviso. In 1988 Yugoslavia hosted FIRA Championship in Makarska, Tucepi and Baska Voda.

 U19 since 1977 played annual games against U17 side.

Results

The Most Capped Players

External links
 European Nations Cup (rugby union)
 Home page of FIRA-A.E.R.

Bibliography 
 Proslo je 30 godina,anniversary book,  1985, published by SFR Yugoslavia Rugby Union
 20 godina Ragbi kluba Zagreb, 1984, published by RK Zagreb
 10 godina ragbija na Makarskoj rivijeri 1968-1978, published by RK Energoinvest Makarska
 50 godina Ragbi kluba Nada 1959-2009, published by RK Nada Split

References 
 Bath, Richard (ed.) The Complete Book of Rugby (Seven Oaks Ltd, 1997 )

Rugby
Rugby union in Yugoslavia
Former national rugby union teams
Multinational rugby union teams